Alexander Willis House is a historic home located at Coeymans Landing in Albany County, New York.  It was built about 1852 and is a two-story frame dwelling in a transitional Greek Revival / Gothic Revival style.  The rear elevation has a large two-story wing with enclosed porch.  It features broad eaves supported by ornate brackets and broad paneled corner boards.  The steep gable roof has a central dormer with smaller flanking dormers.

It was listed on the National Register of Historic Places in 2003.

References

Houses on the National Register of Historic Places in New York (state)
Gothic Revival architecture in New York (state)
Greek Revival houses in New York (state)
Houses completed in 1852
Houses in Albany County, New York
National Register of Historic Places in Albany County, New York
1852 establishments in New York (state)